Felipe Carrillo Puerto is a suburb/town in Santa Lucía del Camino in the Mexican state of Oaxaca, named after the politician Felipe Carrillo Puerto.

One of its ex-mayors, Pedro Carmona was alleged to be the person who shot dead Indymedia New York City journalist Bradley Roland Will on October 27, 2006.

References

External links
 https://web.archive.org/web/20070927021502/http://www.noticias-oax.com.mx/articulos.php?id_sec=3&id_art=29095

Populated places in Oaxaca